The 1906 Fordham football team was an American football team that represented Fordham University as an independent during the 1906 college football season. Fordham claims a 15–5 record, though College Football Data Warehouse (CFDW) lists the team's record as 5–3. 

Fred L. Smith was the team's coach for a third, non-consecutive year. Quarterback Howard Gargan was the team captain from 1905 to 1907 and took over as head coach in 1908.  The team played its home games at Fordham Field in The Bronx and at the Polo Grounds in Manhattan.

Schedule
The following eight games are reported in Fordham's media guide, CFDW, and contemporaneous press coverage.

The following are 12 additional games reported in the Fordham media guide.

References

Fordham
Fordham Rams football seasons
Fordham football